The Japan Hockey Association is the governing body of field hockey in Japan. It is affiliated to IHF International Hockey Federation and AHF Asian Hockey Federation. The headquarters of the federation are in Tokyo, Japan.

Kazuyasu Misu is the President of the Japan Hockey Association and Nobuo Ishikawa is the General Secretary.

See also
 Japan men's national field hockey team
 Japan women's national field hockey team

References

External links
 Japan Hockey Association

Japan
Hockey
Field hockey in Japan